Zaba is a community in Kwilu province, Democratic Republic of the Congo (DRC).

References

Populated places in Kwilu Province